The Telegraph (Телеграф) is a Bulgarian national daily newspaper published in Sofia. It was established in January 2005 as a low-cost, short-article  alternative to the mainstream press. Its circulation rose rapidly: in May 2005 it was 38,000, but by April 2007 it had reached 80,000. By early 2008, it was estimated to be the national leader with 110,000 copies sold on some days.

The paper belongs to a Bulgarian company which also publishes the Monitor daily and Politika weekly.

As of February 2008, the newspaper's website shows only its front page.

References

External links
Telegraph's website

2005 establishments in Bulgaria
Bulgarian-language newspapers
Mass media in Sofia
Daily newspapers published in Bulgaria
Publications established in 2005